Chandrashekhar Govind Agashe (IAST: Candraśekhara Āgāśe; 14 February 1888 — 9 June 1956) was an Indian industrialist and lawyer, best remembered as the founder of the Brihan Maharashtra Sugar Syndicate Ltd. He served as the managing agent of the company from its inception in 1934 till his death in 1956. He served as the President of the Bhor State Council from 1932 to 1934.

Today, the Chandrashekhar Agashe College of Physical Education in Pune, the CGA – BMTRC in the Brihan Maharashtra College of Commerce, and the Chandrashekhar Agashe High School in Shreepur are named after him. He is also the namesake of the Chandrashekhar Agashe Museum wing in the Raja Dinkar Kelkar Museum and the Chandrashekhar Agashe Road in Shaniwar Peth, Pune. He also became the namesake of the Agashe pattern, a means of equity crowdfunding, among businesses and press in Maharashtra between 1934 and 1956.

Biography

Early life and family: 1888–1914
Agashe was born on 14 February 1888 at the Velhe Mahal in the town of Bhor, at the time part of the Bhor State in present-day Maharashtra. He was the eldest of four children to Govind Agashe II and Radhabai Agashe (née Bhimabai Bapat). His family was Chitpavan Brahmin, and was established since the 1590s as the aristocratic Agashe gharana of the village of Mangdari in the Bhor State. The family was traditionally occupied as the savkars (money lenders/bankers) and pseudo-hereditary chief justiciars under the Pantsachiv Kings of the Kingdom, and thus owned majority of the land in the village as vassals to the Pantsachiv rulers, where they continued the traditional family businesses of money lending and tenanted farming. Agashe's father, when serving as the chief justiciar, was the only Brahmin savkar at the royal court of Bhor at the time of his birth.

Agashe's maternal family were members of the aristocratic Bapat gharana of Kalyan, having settled a branch of the original family in Junnar in 1698, traditionally occupied as the chieftains of the town. His mother was the fourth daughter of Junnar's hereditary mamledar, Ramchandra Bapat V (b.1828, at Kamshet), who worked as a case historian and published several historical cartographs of old Pune after he was appointed the Karbhari of Tulsi Baug by the Sardar Khire (Tulsibaugwale) family in Pune.

After his father's death in 1899, Agashe was meant to inherit the ancestral estate at age 11; but due to his youth, his paternal relatives unlawfully seized the lands, and ousted Agashe's mother and her children from the family home. She relocated the family to her parents' residence in Shaniwar Peth, Pune in 1900. The loss of the family's estate, made Agashe accept secretarial work at the Indian Post Office to support himself and his siblings through school. Later, he was left the Omkareshwar Mandir in Shaniwar Peth in the former owner's will. Agashe attended the Nutan Marathi Vidyalaya, matriculating in 1905 at the age of 17, and later graduated with a Bachelor of Arts from Fergusson College in 1914, at the age of 26.

In 1914, Agashe married Dwarka Gokhale, the eldest daughter of Narayan Gokhale VI from the aristocratic Gokhale gharana of Dharwad. Her family had served as the hereditary royal saraf (jewellers) to the Peshwa Bhat family since the 18th century. She was a great niece of Bapu Gokhale, a general under Peshwa Baji Rao II of the 
Maratha Empire. She adopted the name Indirabai Agashe after marriage, and the couple had a total of eleven children (including sons Jagdish "Panditrao" Agashe and Dnyaneshwar Agashe, and daughter Shakuntala Karandikar), from which nine survived to adulthood.

Career as an Educator, Lawyer and the Bhor State Council: 1914–1934 
From 1914 to 1917, Agashe taught mathematics at the Nutan Marathi Vidyalaya in Pune, after which he was occupied as a visiting professor at a convent school in Karachi. From 1917 to 1926, Agashe worked as an educator in Mumbai, while he pursued the study of law, graduating with an L.L.B from the Government Law College, Mumbai in 1919. He began practicing his advocacy in Pune and was a lawmaking advisor to the Bhor State government.

Between 1920 and 1932, he was also appointed the Chief Justiciar at the royal court of Shankarrao Chimnajirao, 10th Raja of Bhor (r. 1871 – 1922), continuing to serve under his successor Raghunathrao II Shankarrao, 11th Raja of Bhor (r. 1922 – 1948). Agashe encountered political unrest between the commoners and the gentry at the Pantsachiv's court resulting in violent rioting from the common-folk of the Bhor State. Agashe co-wrote an opinion piece against this political factionalism with Narasimha Chintaman Kelkar in the newspaper Kesari. With the permission of the king, he soon established a Lokpaksh for carrying out fair trial at the royal court to resolve conflicts.

The discouraging response to the Lokpaksh from the Pantsachiv's subjects led Agashe to consider retiring from law in the late 1920s. Upon attending a speech by Bal Gangadhar Tilak, Agashe and his family began practicing the principles of the Swadeshi movement and started considering entrepreneurial ventures as a means to participate in the Indian independence movement in Maharashtra. Agashe supported several Indian freedom fighters, including Lokmanya Tilak and Vinayak Damodar Savarkar, but never considered entering politics himself; his younger brother, Narayan Agashe III actively participated in politics surrounding the Indian independence movement, serving prison time for rioting against the British Raj in the early 1930s, before aiding his elder brother in his business venture.

In 1932, Agashe was appointed as the Secretary of the Bhor State Council, and in under a year, he was elected to the post of the President of the Council, which he maintained till 1934. As president, he provided financial encouragement and legal counsel to small and new business owners in Maharashtra. During his presidency, Agashe used his legal acumen to seize back the family's lost estates in Mangdari from his paternal relations.

The Brihan Maharashtra Sugar Syndicate Ltd.: 1934–1956 

Earlier in 1933, the Governor of Bombay, The Lord Brabourne promoted the production of indigenous sugar, having had increased the import tax on the commodity shipping in from Mauritius. This enabled Agashe to found the Brihan Maharashtra Sugar Syndicate Ltd. on 21 September 1934, as a limited liability company after two years of crowd-funding campaigns, with funds collected from amongst the Maharashtrian middle classes. Prior to the syndicate's establishment, Agashe had aided Atmaram Raoji Bhat in the establishment of the Mahratta Chamber of Commerce in March 1934; and further guided the Chamber to pass legislation along with the Government of Mumbai for mandatory government aid for all Maharashtrian factory based businesses.

Between 1934 and 1936, Agashe envisioned opening a factory branch of the Syndicate in his hometown of Bhor, and began cultivating 2,000 acres of land for the plantation of sugar cane. Plans for the factory were shot down after Agashe met with strong opposition from the local landed gentry. In 1935, he began employing tenanted farmers of the local gentry and independent farmers as producers or transportation workers of the sugar cane for the syndicate in the village of Bhorgaon. By 1936, he had licensed or purchased 12,000 acres of farm land to support the syndicate, being lauded for reviving the local economy and consequently receiving further land grants from bankers in Akluj and several politicians in the Bhor State. During this period, with Agashe being a brahmin, the syndicate received opposition and resentment from local Maratha politicians.

After Agashe established the syndicate's headquarters at the Commonwealth Building on Laxmi Road, the Mahratta Chamber of Commerce declared the sale of 300,000 shares of the syndicate, with the first share going at Rs. 25 in January 1935. Between 1935 and 1937, Agashe toured several states and jagirs within the Deccan States Agency, promoting the syndicate at several village gram panchayats. Upon going public, Agashe was supported by the Kesari newspaper with public relations and received financial encouragement from the newly established Bank of Maharashtra. Agashe's mode of operation and rallying for investment or sales of shares, was popularly regarded as the Agashe pattern among Pune businesses and press. This business  modus operandi involved the collection of risk capital in the form of equity, instead of debentures. Agashe became associated with this procedure after becoming one of the first few businesses in Maharashtra to successfully raise funds with this method. In November 1937, Agashe ordered sugar cane processing machinery from Škoda Works in Czechoslovakia before the outbreak of World War II. Following Adolf Hitler's rise to power and the German occupation of Czechoslovakia, Agashe considered retracting his order, but received the ordered machinery before the Reichswerke Hermann Göring took over Škoda.

He began construction for the first factory in April 1938, and finally established the syndicate's first sugar cane processing factory in the village of Bhorgaon in March 1939, further purchasing an estate and the surrounding lands as a means to look after his own sugar plantations, with the syndicate's principal factory soon producing 150,000 sacs of sugar per annum by 1940. Selling the sugar under the trademark Shree, the village panchayat of Bhorgaon changed the village's official name to Shreepur. At this time, Agashe continued to practice law from the Joshi Wada in Sadashiv Peth, Pune alongside his brother's practice of business consultation.

In 1943, the Bombay Presidency decreed the plantation of food crops as mandatory for private sugar manufacturers in order to support British troops during World War II. Agashe founded the Laxmi Narayan Farmers' Union so as to meet the demand for food crops from the British Raj without disrupting the sugar cane processing; this move was not popular with many of Agashe's employed farmers because of low profitability. After Indian independence in 1947, Agashe was able to expand the syndicate's production to 1000 tonnes of sugar cane processed per annum by 1950. After Gandhi's assassination by Nathuram Godse in 1948, Agashe nor the syndicate were victimized or vandalized in the immediate aftermath of riots against Brahmin houses and businesses. However, the family's wada on their Mangdari estate, along with their Ram temple was burned down.

By 1953, there was strong opposition to Agashe's role as the managing director of the syndicate from his critics. This was backlash from several scandals and court cases involving Agashe or the syndicate in allegations of duping shareholders and depositors in the early 1950s. Agashe responded to these scandals by writing all of the press releases of the syndicate himself in the newspaper Kesari, which gained him notoriety among the newspaper's predominantly Marathi readership for their humor or references to pop culture of the time. He further published a 400-page report criticizing his retractors of corruption and factionalism based on evidence that his critics were backed by his competitor Karamshi Jethabhai Somaiya, who had previously shown interest in purchasing the syndicate.

Death: 1956
On 9 June 1956, while on a spiritual retreat in Jogeshwari, Agashe began showing symptoms of myocardial infarction and was recommended by his doctor to return home. He died that same day, from a heart attack upon reaching his residence in Shaniwar Peth, Pune. Having left the syndicate in a strong position with a decentralised management, S. L. Limaye took over as chairman of the board of directors of the company from 1959 till 1990, while K. V. Champhekar took over as managing director of the company from 1957 to 1962, followed by G. S. Valimbe from 1963 to 1969, until Agashe's sons Panditrao and Dnyaneshwar became joint managing directors in July 1970.

Philanthropy 
Agashe's most notable philanthropic donation came in the form of the foundation of the Brihan Maharashtra College of Commerce in November 1944, after he donated capital towards the infrastructure of the college to the Deccan Education Society. In honor of his donation, the Society named the commerce college after Agashe's sugar syndicate. His donation was further used by the society in development of their Willingdon College, Ahilyadevi High School, Navin Marathi School and the Ranade Baalak Mandir. He also donated to the Brihan Maharashtra Bhuvan in New Delhi. Agashe's philanthropy was heavily criticized by his competition, who viewed it as self-fulfilling.

Agashe began constructing the Agashe Primary School in the village of Shreepur in April 1942, with the school receiving sanctions from the Government in July 1943. He further donated to the campaign of Indian freedom fighter Narhar Vishnu Gadgil. He also donated to the Bhandarkar Oriental Research Institute towards their research work on the Mahabharata. He also established the Brihan Maharashtra Bhavan in New Delhi for the growing Marathi diaspora in the capital.

Legacy 

Agashe died of a Myocardial infarction at the age of 68 on 9 June 1956 at his residence in Shaniwar Peth, Pune. He was survived by his wife Indirabai Agashe, until her death in 1981. He was survived in business by his sons Panditrao Agashe and Dnyaneshwar Agashe. He is remembered as one of the influential people from Pune in the 20th century.

In July 1977, the founder of the Mahrashtriya Mandal of Pune, Shivrampant Damle, established the Chandrashekhar Agashe College of Physical Education in Gultekdi, Pune, honoring Agashe posthumously. Agashe was further honored when the Pune Municipal Corporation renamed the street in Shaniwar Peth, Pune where his family had maintained a traditional brahmin Wada upon relocating to Pune, as the Chandrashekhar Agashe Road.

In 1993/94, the Brihan Maharashtra College of Commerce celebrated its golden jubilee by commissioning the Chandrashekhar Govind Agashe Business Motivation, Training and Research Centre (CGA – BMTRC) in his honor, which was inaugurated in August 1998.

Agashe's sons began work on the Chandrashekhar Agashe High School in the village of Shreepur in 1955, and donated his family collection of ancient Indian musical instruments to the Raja Dinkar Kelkar Museum. The exhibit was titled the Chandrashekhar Agashe Museum wing, honoring the kinship of Agashe's widow and the founder of the museum, Dr. Dinkar G. Kelkar, with them being fourth cousins.

In 1992, Agashe was the subject of a biography written by his second-eldest daughter Shakuntala Karandikar. In 1997, Agashe became the namesake of his great-grand son Chandrashekhar Agashe II. In 2004, the Pune Ithihasik Vastu Smruti (Pune Heritage department of the Kesari Trust) honoured Agashe with a blue plaque outside the Deo Wada, his residence during his lifetime, in Shaniwar Peth, Pune.

Notes

References

Bibliography

Further reading

1888 births
1956 deaths
Indian industrialists
20th-century Indian lawyers
Indian Hindus
Businesspeople from Pune
20th-century Indian businesspeople
20th-century Indian philanthropists
Businesspeople from Maharashtra
Indian company founders